The Ship and the Sea (Portuguese: O Navio e o Mar) is a documentary film written and directed by Lara Sousa, and Everlane Moraes and produced by Lara Sousa, Everlane Moraes, Matheus Mello and Emerson Dindo.

Production
The creative documentary film is to be shot and produced in Brazil, Mozambique and Spain by the production companies: La Selva Ecosistema Creatiu and Produtora Portátil. The film output format is in Color, Digital/Digital 5.1, Dolby Stereo format. The production is still being developed.

Plot/Synopsis
A decision was reached by Everlane and Lara from Brazil and Mozambique, respectively, who are both black filmmakers, to mirror by travelling to each other's country in a crisscross manner and then, looking at each other's films inquisitively to pick out the missing traits of their black identities on both sides in order to fill in the missing trait gaps.

Reception
The film was selected at the 11th Durban International Film Festival (DIFF 2020) held between September 10 to 20, online, alongside about 30 other films as one of the Finance Forum Projects.

Awards
The film won at the 2020 Durban FilmMart, the International Documentary Film Festival Amsterdam (IDFA) Award of The Netherlands.

After participating in various international markets, the film started receiving financial funding for its development. Yet in 2020, Everlane Moraes was the first black female Brazilian to be a grantee of the William Greaves Film Fund from Firelight Media with the Ship and the Sea.

In 2021, the film was also recipient of the Sundance Documentary Film Fund, for its development.

References

External links
 O navio e o mar on La Selva
 The Ship and the Sea Official Web bilingual / O Navio e o Mar web

2019 documentary films
2010s Portuguese-language films